AMTS may refer to:

 Automated Motorized Total station, in surveying, instrumentation, and monitoring.
Abbreviated mental test score, in medicine
 Advanced Mobile Telephone System, a 0G method of radio communication
 Automated Maritime Telecommunications System, a commercial mobile radio service used within the US
 Ahmedabad Municipal Transport Service, runs the public bus service in Ahmedabad, India

See also
 AMT (disambiguation)